The women's heptathlon event at the 2007 Summer Universiade was held on 9–10 August.

Medalists

Results

100 metres hurdles
Wind:Heat 1: -0.7 m/s, Heat 2: +0.3 m/s

High jump

Shot put

200 metres
Wind:Heat 1: +0.3 m/s, Heat 2: +0.5 m/s

Long jump

Javelin throw

800 metres

Final standings

References
Results
Final results

Heptathlon
2007 in women's athletics
2007